Radu Paladi (16 January 1927- 30 May 2013) was a Romanian composer, pianist, and conductor. His compositions include stage and film music, choral works, vocal music and vocal-symphonic works, chamber music, symphonic music as well as concertos.

Education 
Radu Paladi studied piano with Titus Tarnavski at the Cernăuți Conservatory (at that time in Romania, now in Chernivtsi, Ukraine) from 1941 until 1943. Between 1947 and 1956 he studied piano with Florica Musicescu, composition with Leon Klepper, harmony with Paul Constantinescu and instrumentation (orchestration) with Theodor Rogalski at the Royal Academy of Theatre and Music, later known as the Ciprian Porumbescu Conservatory in Bucharest.

Teaching 
Paladi started his teaching career from 1954 until 1963 as an assistant and continued from 1963 until 1996 as a lecturer at the Caragiale National University of Theatre and Film in Bucharest.

Artistic career 

Paladi was a member of the Association of Romanian Composers and Musicologists since its foundation in 1949. He performed as a pianist in song recitals and chamber music in Romania, Spain, and Germany. As a soloist in his own piano concerto, Paladi played with various Romanian orchestras, e.g., the Iași Philharmonic Orchestra on the occasion of the first performance of this work, with the Botoșani Philharmonic Orchestra, and with the Bucharest National Radio orchestra with whom he recorded his piano concerto. From 1969 to 1972, Paladi worked as a conductor and artistic director of the Philharmonic Orchestra in Botoșani. Apart from being busy conducting numerous Romanian amateur choirs and vocal ensembles, he was a frequent judge at various national contests of vocal and instrumental music as well as composition contests.

Honours and awards 

 First prize at the National Composition Contest in Bucharest (1951)
 First prize and awarded the gold medal at the International Composition Contest in Moscow for the cantata "Dar de nuntă" ("Wedding Present") for mixed choir and orchestra (1957)
 Third prize at the Moscow International Contest for his string quartet no. 1 (1957)
 Medal of Work third class (1959) and Order of Merit in Culture third class in Romania (1968)
 Award of the Romanian Association of Composers and Musicologists (1974, 1976, 1978, 1979, 1981, 1984, 1986, 1987, 1988, 1993, 1996)
 23rd-of-August Medal (1979)
 Award of the Romanian Academy (1980)
 Award Romanian Order of Knights (2000)
 Award of Excellence of the Romanian Association of Composers and Musicologists (2002)
 Grand award of the Romanian Association of Composers and Musicologists to honour the composer's life's work (2007)

Musical works

Stage music 
 Pălăria Florentină (A Florentine Hat), 1957
 Sălbatecii (The Savages), 1958
 Școala Calomniei (The School of Calumny), 1961
 D-ale Carnavalului (Carnival Hustle and Bustle), 1962

Film music 
 Fluierașul fermecat (The Little Magic Flute), animated cartoon, directed by Pascal Rădulescu and Constantin Popescu (1957)
 Ciulinii Bărăganului (The Thistles of the Bărăgan), directed by Louis Daquin (1957)
 La porțile pământului (At the Gates of the Earth), directed by Geo Saizescu (1965)
 Pe drumul Thaliei (On Thalia's Way), (1965)

Choral works 
 more than 200 works for mixed chorus a cappella, for choir and piano, for choir and orchestra
 60 colinde (among them Christmas carols and Easter chants) for mixed chorus a cappella based on the collections of Béla Bartók, George Breazul, Gheorghe Cucu (1990-1995)
 12 poems for mixed chorus a cappella based on verses by Mihai Eminescu (1988-1992)

Vocal music 
 8 songs for soprano and piano
 4 duets for soprano, bass-baritone, and piano
 13 songs for bass-baritone and piano

Works for piano 
 Suite for piano (1940)
 Theme with variations (1950)
 Rondo a capriccio (1954)
 Prelude and fugue (1955)
 Cadence for the piano concerto in C minor, K. 491 of W.A. Mozart (2011)

Chamber music 
 String quartet no. 1 in C minor (1955)
 Wind quintet (1998)
 String quartet no. 2 (2013)

Vocal symphonic works 
 Cantata "Dar de nuntă" (Wedding Present), 1957
 Oratorio "Oratoriul Eliberării" (Oratorio of Liberation), 1959
 Cantata "Poem de slavă" (Poem of Fame), 1964

Symphonic music 
 Symphonic suite "Fluierașul fermecat" (The Little Magic Flute), 1954
 Symphonic suite "Sălbatecii" (The Savages), 1958
 Symphonic suite "Ciulinii Băragănului" (The Thistles of the Bărăgan), 1957

Concertos 
 Concerto for piano and orchestra in C major (1989)
 Concerto for violin and orchestra in E minor (2002)

CD Recordings 
 Quartetto per archi nr. 1, Quartetto Academica, prodotto della DYNAMIC s.r.l. Genova, 1979
 2 Colinde: "Dimineața di Crăciunu", "Colo sus la răsăritu", Corul Academic Radio, dirijor Aurel Grigoraș, UCMR-ADA 1523011 Editura Casa Radio, 2001
 2 Colinde, Corul Academic Radio, dirijor Aurel Grigoraș, Producător: Editura Muzicală UCMR, 2005
 "De ce nu-mi vii?", Corul Academic Radio, în: Antologia Muzicii românești, Creații corale românești nr. 1, Producător: UCMR-ADA 2A 18481
 "Noapte de vară", Corul Academic Radio, dirijor Aurel Grigoraș, în: Antologia Muzicii românești, Creații corale românești nr. 2, Producător: UCMR-ADA 031.076050
 "Atât de fragedă", Corul Academic Radio, dirijor Dan Mihai Goia, în: Antologia Muzicii românești, Creații corale românești nr.9, Producător: UCMR-ADA RO9AF125012655
 2 Colinde: "Dimineața di Crăciunu", "Colo sus la răsăritu", Corul Academic Radio în: Antologia Muzicii românești, Creații corale românești nr. 10, Producător: UCMR-ADA RO9AF105012464, 2009
 String Quartet no. 1 in C minor, Lupot String Quartet, ars sonandi, 2015
 Streichquartett Nr. 1 c-Moll, Martfeld Quartett, Coviello Classics, 2016 COV91607

Works published in print 
 Suita pentru pian (piano suite) Editura de Stat, București, 1951 (out of print)
 Suita pentru pian (piano suite), Editura de Stat pentru literatură și artă, București, 1954 (out of print)
 Suita pentru pian (piano suite), Editura Muzicală, București 1968 (out of print)
 Suita pentru pian (piano suite, fragment)in: Rumänische Klavierminiaturen, Leipzig, Peters Verlag, 1976
 Rondo a capriccio, Editura Muzicală a Uniunii Compozitorilor din România, București, 1953 (out of print)
 Rondo a capriccio, Editura Muzicală a Uniunii Compozitorilor din România, București, 1954 (out of print)
 Cvartet de coarde nr. 1 do minor (string quartet no. 1 in C minor), Editura Muzicală, București, 1960 (out of print)
 Coruri (Choruses), Editura de Stat pentru literatură și artă, București, 1956 (out of print)
 Cântece și Coruri (chants and choruses), Editura Muzicală a Uniunii Compozitorilor din România, București, 1967 (out of print)
 Poem de slavă pentru tenor, soliști, cor mixt și orchestră, pe versuri de Corneliu Șerban (Poem of Fame for tenor, soloists, mixed chorus and orchestra based on verses of Corneliu Șerban), Editura Muzicală a Uniunii Compozitorilor din România, București, 1968 (out of print)
 Două piese pentru cor și orchestră pe versuri de Vlaicu-Bârna (two pieces for choir and orchestra based on verses of Vlaicu-Bârna), Editura Muzicală, București, 1975
 Dar de Nuntă, Cantată pentru cor mixt și orchestră pe versuri de Ion Serebreanu (Wedding Present, cantata for mixed chorus and orchestra based on verses of Ion Serebreanu), Editura Muzicală, București, 2003
 Dar de Nuntă, reducție pentru pian (Wedding Present, piano score), Editura Muzicală, București, 2003
 8 Lieduri pentru soprană și pian (8 songs for soprano and piano), Editura Muzicală, București, 2013
 Concert pentru vioară și orchestră (concerto for violin and orchestra), Editura Muzicală, București, 2014
 Cvintet de suflători (wind quintet), Editura Muzicală, București, 2014
 Lieduri și Duete pentru voci grave, medii, înalte și pian (songs and duets for deep, middle and high voices and piano), Editura Muzicală, București, 2014
 12 Poeme pe versuri de Mihai Eminescu (12 poems based on verses of Mihai Eminescu), Editura Muzicală, București, 2014
 Cvartet de coarde nr. 2 (string quartet no. 2), Editura Muzicală, București, 2014
 Concert pentru pian și orchestră (concerto for piano and orchestra), Editura Muzicală, București, 2015
 Cvartet de coarde nr. 1 do minor (string quartet no. 1 C minor), Editura Muzicală, București, 2017

Literature 
 Cosma, Viorel: Muzicieni români, Lexicon, Ed. Muzicală, București 1970
 Popovici, Doru: Radu Paladi, Poeme corale pe versuri de Mihai Edminescu, revista Muzica 6, nr. 3 1995
 Popovici, Doru: Radu Paladi, Colindele pentru cor a cappella, revista Muzica 8, nr. 1
 Zbarcea, Veronica: Radu Paladi, Spiritul compozitorului, revista Radio România nr. 259, 14 ianuarie 2002
 Codreanu, Petre: Radu Paladi, Concertul pentru vioară și orchestră, programul Filarmonicii George Enescu, 15 februarie 2007
 Scurtulescu, Dan: Radu Paladi, din nou, revista Actualitatea muzicală nr. 4, aprilie 2007
 Manea, Carmen: Concertul pentru pian de Radu Paladi, revista Modele umane și repere profesionale, Colecția AkadeMusica nr. 4, Ed. UNMB 2012
 Alexandrescu, Ozana: Radu Paladi, Concert pentru pian și orchestră, programul Filarmonicii George Enescu, 8 decembrie 2016
 Dediu, Dan: Radu Paladi - o evocare, revista Actualitatea muzicală nr. 6, iunie 2013
 Stäbler, Marcus: Rezension der CD des Martfeld Quartetts (2015), FonoForum, 9/2016, S. 51
 Kneipel, Eberhard: Rezension der CD des Martfeld Quartetts (2015), Das Orchester, 12/2016, S. 72

References 
Cosma, Viorel: Muzicieni români, Lexicon, Ed. Muzicală, 1970

External links 
 http://dumitrugraur.wordpress.com/2013/06/03/in-memoriam-radu-paladi/
 http://no14plusminus.ro/2013/06/09/radu-paladi-in-memoriam/
 http://www.romania-muzical.ro/stiri/stire.shtml?g=5&c=49&a=1167891

1927 births
2013 deaths
People from Storozhynets
Romanian composers
National University of Music Bucharest alumni
Romanian pianists